Sobreiro is, along with sobreira, the Portuguese (and old Galician) name for the cork oak tree (Quercus suber), and may refer to:

Places 
 O Sobreiro, a place in the Xustáns parish, Ponte Caldelas municipality, Galicia (Spain)
 Sobreiro, a place in the Lavadores parish, Vigo municipality, Galicia (Spain)
 Sobreiro, a little hamlet in the Mafra municipality (Portugal)
 Sobreiró de Baixo, a parish in Vinhais municipality (Portugal)
 Bairro dos Sobreiros, a place in Rio Maior municipality (Portugal)
 Vale Sobreiro, a place in Caranguejeira parish, in Leiria municipality (Portugal)

Art works 
 O Sobreiro, a 1905 painting by Carlos I of Portugal

See also 
 Sobreira (disambiguation)
 Sobroso
 Sobro
 Sobral (disambiguation)
 Sobrado (disambiguation)
 Sobredo
 Sobrido